William John Mullen (January 23, 1896 in St. Louis, Missouri – May 4, 1971) was a professional baseball player who played third base from 1920 to 1928.

Surviving family
Bill Mullen is survived by his daughter, June Mitchell, and her three sons, Tom, Robert, and Terry Mitchell. Tom owned a jazz restaurant in Cocoa Beach, Florida for some time until 2008, and now works for Kennedy Space Center. Also survived by his daughter, Dorothy Murray, and her three children, the late Linda Best (Murray), William Murray of Kirkwood, Mo. and  Kim Higgins (Murray), Sappington, Missouri.

External links

1896 births
1971 deaths
Major League Baseball third basemen
Brooklyn Robins players
St. Louis Browns players
Detroit Tigers players
Baseball players from St. Louis
Mobile Bears players
Springfield Ponies players
Fort Worth Panthers players
Toronto Maple Leafs (International League) players
Reading Keystones players
Buffalo Bisons (minor league) players
Beaumont Exporters players
Galveston Buccaneers players
Jacksonville Jax players